The 2022 season was the Detroit Lions' 93rd in the National Football League (NFL), the 21st playing their home games at Ford Field and their second under the head coach/general manager tandem of Dan Campbell and Brad Holmes.

On March 28, NFL Films and HBO announced that the Lions would be featured in the newest season of Hard Knocks, a show that follows NFL teams through training camp.

Despite a 1–6 start, the Lions had a mid-season turnaround, winning eight of their next ten games. The Lions finished the season 9–8, improving upon their 3–13–1 record from the previous season. This marked their first winning record since 2017. The Lions won five out of six divisional games, splitting their season series with the Minnesota Vikings.

Prior to taking the field in Week 18, the Lions were eliminated from playoff contention for the sixth consecutive season after a Seattle Seahawks win over the Los Angeles Rams. While a win would give the Lions the same 9–8 record as the Seahawks, they would lose the playoff spot based on the teams' Week 4 head-to-head meeting, won by the Seahawks. The Lions nevertheless defeated the Green Bay Packers in the final game of the NFL regular season to eliminate their NFC North rivals and allow Seattle to claim the final NFC wild card berth.

Player movements

Free agents

Additions

Subtractions

Draft

Notes

Staff

Coaching changes
 January 10: Anthony Lynn fired as offensive coordinator.

 February 9: Ben Johnson named offensive coordinator.

 October 31: Aubrey Pleasant fired as defensive backs coach.

Final roster

Preseason

Regular season

Schedule

Note: Intra-division opponents are in bold text.

Game summaries

Week 1: vs. Philadelphia Eagles

To open the regular season, the Lions hosted the Philadelphia Eagles. The Lions opened the scoring in the first quarter via a one-yard touchdown run from Jamaal Williams. The Eagles responded with 21 unanswered points in the second quarter via two one-yard touchdown runs from Jalen Hurts and Miles Sanders, respectively, and a 27-yard interception return by James Bradberry. The Lions responded with a seven-yard touchdown run from D'Andre Swift. The Eagles scored the final points of the half via a 23-yard field goal by Jake Elliott, which made the score 24–14 in favor of Philadelphia at half-time. The Eagles scored 14 points in the third quarter via a two-yard touchdown run from Kenneth Gainwell and a one-yard touchdown run from Boston Scott. The Lions responded with a four-yard touchdown pass from Jared Goff to Amon-Ra St. Brown. The Lions scored 14 points in the fourth quarter via a one-yard touchdown run from Williams and a 22-yard touchdown pass from Goff to D. J. Chark, making the final score 38–35 in favor of Philadelphia.

Week 2: vs. Washington Commanders

In week 2, the Lions hosted the Washington Commanders. The Lions scored 12 points in the first quarter via a 35-yard field goal by Austin Seibert, a fumble forced by Charles Harris in the end zone for a safety, and a 13-yard touchdown pass from Jared Goff to Amon-Ra St. Brown. The Lions extended their lead in the second quarter via a 48-yard field goal by Seibert and a three-yard touchdown pass from Goff to Josh Reynolds, which made the score 22–0 in favor of Detroit at half-time. The Commanders finally got on the board in the third quarter via a 15-yard touchdown pass from Carson Wentz to Curtis Samuel and a 20-yard touchdown pass from Wentz to Logan Thomas. The Lions responded with a 22-yard touchdown pass from Goff to D'Andre Swift. The teams exchanged touchdowns in the fourth quarter, first a one-yard touchdown run from Antonio Gibson for the Commanders, then an 11-yard touchdown pass from Goff to St. Brown for the Lions. The Commanders scored the final points of the game via a one-yard touchdown pass from Wentz to Jahan Dotson, making the final score 36–27 in favor of Detroit.

Amon-Ra St. Brown had 2 touchdown receptions for the Lions and set an NFL record with his 6th consecutive game with 8+ catches.

Week 3: at Minnesota Vikings

In week 3, the Lions visited their divisional rival, the Minnesota Vikings. The Lions opened the scoring in the first quarter via a two-yard touchdown run from Jamaal Williams. The Lions extended their lead in the second quarter via a five-yard touchdown pass from Jared Goff to T. J. Hockenson. The Vikings responded with 14 points in the quarter via a one-yard touchdown pass from Kirk Cousins to Adam Thielen and a four-yard touchdown run from Dalvin Cook, tying the score at 14–14 at half-time. The Lions scored 10 points in the third quarter via a 40-yard field goal by Austin Seibert and a 13-yard touchdown run from Williams. The Vikings scored 14 points in the fourth quarter via a six-yard touchdown run from Alexander Mattison and a 28-yard touchdown pass from Cousins to K. J. Osborn with 45 seconds left in the half. The Lions' attempted comeback failed when Goff's pass intended for D. J. Chark was intercepted by Josh Metellus with 17 seconds remaining in the game, making the final score 28–24 in favor of Minnesota.

Week 4: vs. Seattle Seahawks

In week 4, the Lions hosted the Seattle Seahawks. The Seahawks opened the scoring in the first quarter via a 17-yard touchdown pass from Geno Smith to Will Dissly. The Lions responded with a 32-yard touchdown pass from Jared Goff to T. J. Hockenson, Dominik Eberle's extra point was wide left. The Seahawks extended their lead via an eight-yard touchdown run from Smith. The Seahawks scored 10 points in the second quarter via a 56-yard field goal by Jason Myers and a two-yard touchdown pass from Smith to Noah Fant. The Lions scored nine points in the quarter via a 49-yard field goal by Eberle and a one-yard touchdown run from Jamaal Williams as time expired in the half. Eberle's extra point was wide right, which made the score 24–15 in favor of Seattle at half-time. The Seahawks scored 14 points in the third quarter via a 40-yard interception return by Tariq Woolen and a 36-yard touchdown run from Rashaad Penny. The Lions responded with a 51-yard touchdown run from Williams and a two-point conversion run by Goff. The Seahawks scored 10 points in the fourth quarter via a 25-yard field goal by Myers and a 41-yard touchdown run from Penny. The Lions scored 22 points in the quarter via a three-yard touchdown pass from Goff to Josh Reynolds and a two-point conversion pass from Goff to Hockenson, a four-yard touchdown pass from Goff to Hockenson, and a two-yard touchdown pass from Goff to Justin Jackson. The Lions' attempted comeback failed when the onside kick was recovered by the Seahawks, making the final score 48–45 in favor of Seattle.

Week 5: at New England Patriots

In week 5, the Lions visited the New England Patriots. The Patriots opened the scoring in the first quarter via a 37-yard field goal by Nick Folk. The Patriots scored 13 points in the second quarter via a 32-yard field goal by Folk, a 59-yard fumble return by Kyle Dugger and a 44-yard field goal by Folk, which made the score 16–0 in favor of New England at half-time. The Patriots scored 10 points in the third quarter via a 37-yard field goal by Folk, and a 24-yard touchdown pass from Bailey Zappe to Jakobi Meyers. The Patriots extended their lead in the fourth quarter via a 29-yard field goal by Folk, making the final score 29–0 in favor of New England. It was the Lions' first shutout loss since week 11 of 2020. The Lions failed to convert six fourth-down tries, the first time in NFL history a team failed to convert a fourth down with six or more tries in a game. The 1995 New England Patriots held the previous record, going 0–5 in a loss to the Denver Broncos. With the loss, the Lions went into their bye week at 1–4.

Week 7: at Dallas Cowboys

Following their bye week, in week 7, the Lions visited the Dallas Cowboys. The Lions opened the scoring in the first quarter via a 40-yard field goal by Michael Badgley. The Cowboys tied the game in the second quarter via a 22-yard field goal by Brett Maher. The Lions responded with a 53-yard field goal by Badgley, which made the score 6–3 in favor of Detroit at half-time. The Lions were held scoreless in the second half. The Cowboys scored a one-yard touchdown run from Ezekiel Elliott in the third quarter to take their first lead of the game. The Cowboys scored 14 points in the fourth quarter via a one-yard touchdown run from Elliott and a two-yard touchdown pass from Dak Prescott to Peyton Hendershot, making the final score 24–6 in favor of Dallas.

Week 8: vs. Miami Dolphins

In week 8, the Lions hosted the Miami Dolphins. The Lions scored 14 points in the first quarter via a seven-yard touchdown run from Jamaal Williams and a seven-yard touchdown pass from Jared Goff to D'Andre Swift. The Dolphins responded with a five-yard touchdown pass from Tua Tagovailoa to Jaylen Waddle. The Dolphins scored 10 points in the second quarter via a 29-yard touchdown pass from Tagovailoa to Waddle and a 45-yard field goal by Jason Sanders. The Lions scored 13 points in the quarter via a one-yard touchdown run from Williams, and two field goals by Michael Badgley, from 42-yards and 26-yards, respectively, which made the score 27–17 in favor of Detroit at half-time. The Lions were held scoreless in the second-half. The Dolphins scored 14 points in the third quarter via a one-yard touchdown run from Alec Ingold and an 11-yard touchdown pass from Tagovailoa to Mike Gesicki. Neither team scored in the fourth quarter, making the final score 31–27 in favor of Miami.

Week 9: vs. Green Bay Packers

In week 9, the Lions hosted their divisional rival, the Green Bay Packers. After a scoreless first quarter, the Lions opened the scoring in the second quarter via a one-yard touchdown pass from Jared Goff to Shane Zylstra and a two-point conversion run from Jamaal Williams, which made the score 8–0 in favor of Detroit at half-time. The Packers scored the only points of the third quarter via a 20-yard touchdown pass from Aaron Rodgers to Allen Lazard. The Lions extended their lead in the fourth quarter via a three-yard touchdown pass from Goff to James Mitchell. The Packers scored the final points of the game via a 25-yard field goal by Mason Crosby, making the final score 15–9 in favor of Detroit. The Lions' defense forced three interceptions, including two in the endzone. This marked the first game since week 15 of 2017 that Rodgers threw three interceptions.

Week 10: at Chicago Bears

In week 10, the Lions visited their divisional rival, the Chicago Bears. The Bears opened the scoring in the first quarter via a 33-yard field goal by Cairo Santos. The Lions responded with a 25-yard field goal by Michael Badgley to tie the game. The teams exchanged touchdowns in the second quarter, first a two-yard touchdown pass from Jared Goff to Brock Wright for the Lions, then a one-yard touchdown run from Justin Fields for the Bears, tying the score at 10–10 at half-time. The Bears scored 14 points in the third quarter via two touchdown passes from Fields to Cole Kmet from six-yards, and 50-yards, respectively. The Lions scored 21 points in the fourth quarter via a nine-yard touchdown run from D'Andre Swift, a 20-yard interception return by Jeff Okudah and a one-yard touchdown run from Jamaal Williams. The Bears responded with a 67-yard touchdown run from Fields, however they missed the extra point, making the final score 31–30 in favor of Detroit.

Week 11: at New York Giants

In week 11, the Lions visited the New York Giants. The Lions opened the scoring in the first quarter via a 24-yard field goal by Michael Badgley. The Giants responded with a three-yard touchdown run from Daniel Jones. John Cominsky  blocked the extra point. The Lions scored 14 points in the second quarter via two touchdown runs from Jamaal Williams from four-yards, and one-yard, respectively, which made the score 17–6 in favor of Detroit at half-time. The Lions scored the only points of the third quarter via a one-yard touchdown run from Williams. The Giants scored 12 points in the fourth quarter via a three-yard touchdown run from Matt Breida and a nine-yard touchdown pass from Jones to Richie James. The Lions extended their lead via a four-yard touchdown run from D'Andre Swift, making the final score 31–18 in favor of Detroit. The win marked the Lions' first three-game winning streak since 2017.

Week 12: vs. Buffalo Bills

For their annual Thanksgiving Day game, the Lions hosted the Buffalo Bills. This was the Bills' second straight game at Ford Field, after their previously scheduled home game against the Cleveland Browns was moved there due to a winter storm in Buffalo that left four feet of snow at Highmark Stadium, rendering it unsafe to use. The Lions opened the scoring in the first quarter via a two-yard touchdown run from Jamaal Williams. The Bills responded with a 19-yard touchdown pass from Josh Allen to Isaiah McKenzie to tie the game. In the second quarter, the Bills took their first lead of the game via a three-yard touchdown run from Allen. The Lions responded with a one-yard touchdown pass from Jared Goff to Amon-Ra St. Brown. The Bills scored the final points of the half via a 47-yard field goal by Tyler Bass, which made the score 17–14 in favor of Buffalo at half-time. The Bills scored the only points of the third quarter after they sacked Goff in the end zone for a safety. The Lions regained the lead in the fourth quarter via a one-yard touchdown pass from Goff to D. J. Chark and a two-point conversion run by D'Andre Swift. The Bills responded with a five-yard touchdown pass from Allen to Stefon Diggs. The Lions scored via a 51-yard field goal by Michael Badgley to tie the score with 23 seconds remaining in the game. The Bills responded with a 45-yard field goal by Bass with two seconds remaining in the game, making the final score 28–25 in favor of Buffalo.

Week 13: vs. Jacksonville Jaguars

In week 13, the Lions hosted the Jacksonville Jaguars. The Lions opened the scoring in the first quarter via a one-yard touchdown run from Jamaal Williams. The Jaguars responded with a 31-yard field goal by Riley Patterson. The Lions extended their lead via 10-yard touchdown pass from Jared Goff to Amon-Ra St. Brown. The Lions scored nine points in the second quarter via three field goals by Michael Badgley from 45-yards, 47-yards, and 38-yards, respectively. The Jaguars scored via a 42-yard field goal by Patterson, which made the score 23–6 in favor of Detroit at half-time. The Lions extended their lead in the third quarter via a one-yard touchdown run from D'Andre Swift. The Jaguars scored their only points of the second half via a three-yard touchdown pass from Trevor Lawrence to Evan Engram and a two-point conversion pass from Lawrence to Jamal Agnew. The Lions scored 10 points in the fourth quarter via a 44-yard field goal by Badgley, and a four-yard touchdown pass from Goff to St. Brown, making the final score 40–14 in favor of Detroit.

Week 14: vs. Minnesota Vikings

In week 14, the Lions hosted their divisional rival, the Minnesota Vikings, in a rematch of week 3. The Lions opened the scoring in the first quarter via a 41-yard touchdown pass from Jared Goff to Jameson Williams, for his first career NFL reception and first career NFL touchdown. The Vikings responded with a one-yard touchdown run from Dalvin Cook to tie the game. The Lions scored the only points of the second quarter via a 48-yard touchdown pass from Goff to D. J. Chark, which made the score 14–7 in favor of Detroit at half-time. The Lions extended their lead in the third quarter via a five-yard touchdown pass from Goff to Josh Reynolds. The Vikings responded with a 23-yard touchdown pass from Kirk Cousins to Adam Thielen and a failed two-point conversion attempt. The Vikings scored 10 points in the fourth quarter via a 41-yard field goal by Greg Joseph and a 15-yard touchdown pass from Cousins to K. J. Osborn. The Lions scored 13 points in the quarter via a 15-yard touchdown run from Justin Jackson and two field goals by Michael Badgley, from 41-yards, and 48-yards, respectively, making the final score 34–23 in favor of Detroit. This is the first time since 2017 in which the Lions defeated all three of their division rivals at least once in the same season.

Week 15: at New York Jets

In week 15, the Lions visited the New York Jets for their second game at MetLife Stadium this season. The Lions opened the scoring in the first quarter via a 47-yard punt return touchdown by Kalif Raymond. In the second quarter, the Jets responded with a 40-yard touchdown pass from Zach Wilson to C. J. Uzomah to tie the game. The Lions regained the lead via a 31-yard field goal by Michael Badgley. The Jets responded with a 34-yard field goal by Greg Zuerlein as time expired in the half, tying the score at 10–10 at half-time. The Lions scored the only points of the third quarter via a 34-yard field goal by Badgley. In the fourth quarter, the Jets scored via a one-yard touchdown pass from Wilson to Uzomah, to take their first lead of the game. The Lions responded with a 51-yard touchdown pass from Jared Goff to Brock Wright, making the final score 20–17 in favor of Detroit. Zuerlein missed a 58-yard field goal wide left that would have sent the game to overtime with one second left.

Week 16: at Carolina Panthers

In week 16, the Lions visited the Carolina Panthers on Christmas Eve. The Panthers opened the scoring in the first quarter via a seven-yard touchdown run from Raheem Blackshear. The Lions responded with a three-yard touchdown pass from Jared Goff to Shane Zylstra to tie the game. The Panthers scored 17 points in the second quarter via a three-yard touchdown run from Sam Darnold, a four-yard touchdown run from D'Onta Foreman and a 37-yard field goal by Eddy Piñeiro, which made the score 24–7 in favor of Carolina at half-time. The teams exchanged touchdowns in the third quarter, first a five-yard touchdown pass from Darnold to D. J. Moore for the Panthers, then a seven-yard touchdown pass from Goff to Zylstra and a failed two-point conversion attempt for the Lions. The Panthers scored six points in the fourth quarter via two field goals by Piñeiro from 40-yards, and 36-yards, respectively. The Lions scored 10 points in the quarter via a one-yard touchdown pass from Goff to Zylstra and a 34-yard field goal by Michael Badgley, making the final score 37–23 in favor of Carolina.

Week 17: vs. Chicago Bears

In week 17, the Lions hosted their divisional rival, the Chicago Bears, in a New Year's Day rematch of week 10. The Bears opened the scoring in the first quarter via a 13-yard touchdown pass from Justin Fields to Cole Kmet. The Lions responded with a two-yard touchdown pass from Jared Goff to Brock Wright to tie the game. The Beas regained the lead via a 23-yard field goal by Cairo Santos. The Lions scored 17 points in the second quarter via a 17-yard touchdown run from D'Andre Swift, a nine-yard touchdown pass from Goff to Wright and a 23-yard field goal by Michael Badgley, which made the score 24–10 in favor of Detroit at half-time. The Bears were held scoreless in the second half. The Lions scored 14 points in the third quarter via a two-yard touchdown run from Jamaal Williams and a 21-yard touchdown pass from Goff to Swift. The Lions scored the only points of the fourth quarter via a 41-yard field goal by Badgley, making the final score 41–10 in favor of Detroit. The Lions swept the Bears for the first time since 2017.

Week 18: at Green Bay Packers

To finish the season, in week 18, the Lions visited their divisional rival, the Green Bay Packers, in a rematch of week 9. The Packers opened the scoring in the first quarter via a 22-yard field goal by Mason Crosby. The Lions responded with a 37-yard field goal by Michael Badgley to tie the game. The Packers regained the lead via a 49-yard field goal by Crosby. The Packers extended their lead in the second quarter via a 48-yard field goal by Crosby. The Lions responded with a 33-yard field goal by Badgley as time expired in the half, which made the score 9–6 in favor of Green Bay at half-time. The Lions took their first lead of the game in the third quarter via a one-yard touchdown run from Jamaal Williams. The Packers responded with a 13-yard touchdown pass from Aaron Rodgers to Allen Lazard to regain the lead. The Lions scored the only points of the fourth quarter via a one-yard touchdown run from Williams, making the final score 20–16 in favor of Detroit. With the Lions win, the Packers were eliminated from playoff contention. (The Lions had already been eliminated from the playoffs based on the Seattle Seahawks win earlier in the day.) With two rushing touchdowns in the game, Williams set the Lions' single-season touchdown record with 17, surpassing the previous record of 16 set by Barry Sanders in 1991.

Standings

Division

Conference

Awards and honors

References

External links
 

Detroit
Detroit Lions seasons
Detroit Lions